Areum, also spelled Ah-reum or A-reum, is a Korean feminine given name. Unlike most Korean given names, which are composed of two single-syllable Sino-Korean morphemes each written with one hanja, Areum is an indigenous Korean name, a single two-syllable word meaning "beauty". It is one of a number of such native names, along with others such as Ha-neul ("sky"), Seul-ki ("wisdom"), and Sora ("conch shell") that have become more popular in South Korea in recent decades.

People with this name include:
 Han A-leum (born 1988), South Korean gymnast, participated in the 2005 World Rhythmic Gymnastics Championships
Hong Ah-reum (born 1989), South Korean actress
Na A-reum (born 1990), South Korean road bicycle racer
Noh Ah-reum (born 1991), South Korean track speed skater
Lee Ah-reum (born 1992), South Korean taekwondo athlete
Shannon Arrum Williams (born 1998), British-born South Korean idol singer

See also
List of Korean given names

References

Korean feminine given names